Burn Your Town is the only album by the Chapman Family. It was released digitally on 4 March 2011 followed by a physical release on 7 March 2011.

Track listing

References

2011 debut albums
The Chapman Family albums